An Inspector General of Flight Safety, also known as Director General (Inspection and Safety) [DG I&S] is an Air Marshal in rank and is one of the Principal Staff Officers of Air Headquarters. He is responsible to the CAS for Inspection of Air Force Bases, Flight Safety and Quality Assurance of Air Force Stores.

He is a 3 star officer of the rank of Air Marshal.

Indian Air Force
Indian military appointments
Indian Air Force appointments